The masiqta is a mass or ritual practiced in the Mandaean religion in order to help guide the soul (nišimta) towards the World of Light in Mandaean cosmology. They are typically performed as funerary rites for Mandaeans who have just died. Although usually translated as "death mass", a few types of masiqta are also performed for living people, such as when priests are ordained.

Purpose
The complex ritual involves guiding the soul through the maṭarta, or toll houses located between the Earth (Tibil) and the World of Light, which are guarded by various uthras and demons.

A successful masiqta merges the incarnate soul (roughly equivalent to the psyche or "ego" in Greek philosophy) and spirit (roughly equivalent to the pneuma or "breath" in Greek philosophy) from the Earth (Tibil) into a new merged entity in the World of Light called the ʿuṣṭuna. The ʿuṣṭuna can then reunite with its heavenly, non-incarnate counterpart (or spiritual image), the dmuta, in the World of Light, where it will reside in the world of ideal counterparts (Mšunia Kušṭa).

Types
There are several different types of masiqtas depending on the cause or timing of the death. Adam and Sheetil (Seth) both have masiqtas named after them.

The masiqta of Sheetil (described in the 1012 Questions) is performed for certain unclean deaths, such as:
priests who die without their myrtle wreaths (klila) or otherwise improperly clad
women who die on or after the 7th day after childbirth
people dying during the 36 hours of seclusion on New Year's Eve (Kanshiy u-Zahly)

The masiqta of Adam is performed for people who have died on one of the mbaṭṭal days, such as on Dehwa Rabba (New Year's Day). The masiqta of Adam and the masiqta of Sheetil are both performed together for people dying in one place but are being buried in another.

The Ṭabahata Masiqta, or the "masiqta of the Parents", is held only once a year during the Parwanaya intercalary festival. Priests recite dozens of prayers, prepare 72 faṭiras (small, round, saltless, half-baked biscuits for ritual use) symbolizing ancestors, and also sacrifice a white dove, called Ba, which symbolizes the spirit. The Šarḥ ḏ-Ṭabahata ("The Scroll of Ṭabahata," or "The Scroll of the Ancestors") describes aspects of this masiqta. According to the 1012 Questions, this masiqta cannot be held at any other time other than during the Parwanaya.

Other masiqtas are listed below.

The Bukra is the first masiqta performed by a priest after ordination (i.e., newly consecrated ganzabra).
The Dabahata or Ṭabahata is celebrated in the names of a man and a woman, and linked with the celebration of Dukrana lhdaia rba zadiqa.
The masiqta of Zihrun Raza Kasia is performed for people who have died during one of the minor mbaṭṭal days (inauspicious days during which all rituals are forbidden), etc. The Šarḥ ḏ-Zihrun Raza Kasia ("The [Masiqta] of Zihrun, the Hidden Mystery") is a Mandaean religious text that describes the ritual and prayer sequence for this masiqta, as well as for the Masbuta of Zihrun Raza Kasia. This masiqta is also described in the 1012 Questions, which also describes the "masiqta of the dukrania."
The masiqta of Samandriʿil: is performed for people who have died from burns, trees falls, or drowning. (Samandriʿil is the name of an uthra.)
The masiqta of Kanat is performed for women who died during pregnancy. (Kanat, also known as Kanat Niṭufta in the Asiet Malkia, is the name of an uthra.)
The masiqta of Hai-Šūm is performed for people who have died from snakebites. (Hai-Šūm is the name of an uthra.)

There are also other masiqtas for bridegrooms who have died during wedding ceremonies, and for moving the remains of a dead person.

See also
Masbuta
Requiem
Prayer for the dead

Bariah
Qeej, used to guide departed souls in Hmong rituals

References

External links
Tamasha (Cleansing) and Masiqta performed at the 2014 Parwanaya festival at the Nepean River in Australia

Mandaic words and phrases
Funerals
Mandaean rituals
Religion and death